Penicillium pancosmium is a species of fungus in the genus Penicillium.

References

pancosmium
Fungi described in 2011